Kenneth William Munro (14 March 1922 – 2 October 2017) was an Australian rules footballer who played with Hawthorn in the Victorian Football League (VFL). 

Prior to playing for Hawthorn, Munro served in both the Australian Army and the Royal Australian Air Force in World War II.

Notes

External links 

1922 births
Australian rules footballers from Melbourne
Hawthorn Football Club players
Camberwell Football Club players
2017 deaths
Australian Army personnel of World War II
Royal Australian Air Force personnel of World War II
Military personnel from Melbourne
People from Elsternwick, Victoria